Mansur Ali Khan (1830–1884) was Nawab of Bengal.

Mansur or Mansoor Ali Khan may also refer to:

People
Mansoor Ali Khan (actor), South Indian actor
Mansoor Ali Khan Pataudi (1941–2011), Indian cricketer; he was also 9th and last Nawab of Pataudi
Mansoor Ali Khan (politician) (born 1941), Indian politician
Mansur Ali Khan (Karnataka cricketer) (born 1972), Indian cricketer who has played for and coached Karnataka

Other
Mansur Ali Khan Pataudi Memorial Lecture, a lecture instituted by BCCI to honour the cricketer

See also
Mansoor Khan (fl. 1988–2008), Indian film director and producer
Manzoor Ali Khan (1922–1980), Sindhi classical singer